Manoba coxi is a moth in the family Nolidae. It was described by Jeremy Daniel Holloway in 2003. It is found on Borneo and Thailand.

The length of the forewings is about 6 mm.

References

Moths described in 2003
Nolinae